Ayn al-Souda which means Black Spring, is a Syrian village located in Markaz Rif Dimashq District, Rif Dimashq. According to the Syria Central Bureau of Statistics (CBS), Ayn al-Souda had a population of 809 in the 2004 census. Nearby localities include Ayn al-Bayda and Khiyarat Dannun.

References 

Populated places in Markaz Rif Dimashq District